S. A. Agulhas is a South African ice-strengthened training ship and former polar research vessel. She was built by Mitsubishi Heavy Industries in Shimonoseki, Japan, in 1978. S. A. Agulhas was used to service the three South African National Antarctic Programme research bases, Gough Island, Marion Island in the Southern Ocean and SANAE IV in Antarctica, as well as various research voyages.

S. A. Agulhas retired from Antarctic service in April 2012 when the replacement vessel, S. A. Agulhas II, was commissioned. She was transferred to the South African Maritime Safety Authority as a training ship.

History

Rudder damage
In December 1991, S. A. Agulhas suffered rudder damage while in the Antarctic. The German icebreaker Polarstern assisted her and by February 1992 S. A. Agulhas had been freed from the pack ice. Once freed, the SAS Drakensberg towed the stricken vessel back to Cape Town for repairs.

Rescue of the Magdalena Oldendorff
S. A. Agulhas participated in a multinational rescue of Magdalena Oldendorff in 2002.
The ice-strengthened cargo ship had become stuck in the ice during severe weather conditions while en route from a Russian Antarctic base to Cape Town. S. A. Agulhas and the Argentine icebreaker Almirante Irízar were dispatched to render assistance. By 1 June the Oryx had transferred 89 Russian Antarctic expedition members and Magdalena Oldendorff crew members to S. A. Agulhas and have transferred  of supplies to the remaining crew. The crew remaining on Magdalena Oldendorff were to await the arrival of Almirante Irizar and attempt to free the ship.

Deaths at sea

On 27 September 2007, Ordinary Seaman Edward Hudley was stabbed and killed while S. A. Agulhas was near Gough Island. Two crew members were accused of murder. The environmental protection vessel Sarah Baartman was dispatched and took custody of the two accused and the deceased's body on 3 October 2007. Both accused were charged with murder on arrival in Cape Town, but all charges were dropped on 6 April 2009.

On the ship's first ever voyage to Marion Island, a member of the crew was killed by another crew member, using a fire axe. On arrival back in Cape Town, the suspected killer could not be found on board the vessel. It was speculated that he jumped over the side of the vessel before arrival in Cape Town.

Mission

The mission of S. A. Agulhas included regular visits to South Africa's base on Antarctica, and to research stations on Gough Island and Marion Island.

Retirement from polar mission and new role

S. A. Agulhas retired from polar supply missions in March 2012, when its replacement, S. A. Agulhas II, arrived.
The Oceans and Coasts Branch of the
Department of Environmental Affairs announced in 2011 that several other government agencies had requested the vessel's transfer, noting that, unlike the new vessel, the first was not designed to carry out scientific research, just icebreaking and that the capability to perform scientific research had been added later. It was also reported that the vessel could be insured for a further two years.

In July 2012 the S. A. Agulhas was recommissioned as a training ship operated by the South African Maritime Safety Authority, the ship will continue to provide facilities for scientific research while training up to seventy merchant marine cadets.

Having undertaken a brief "shakedown" cruise from 4 July 2012, the ship left Cape Town on 2 November 2012 on the first full cruise as a training vessel. Included in the itinerary were visits to Tema and Abidjan to take on additional cadets from Cameroon, Gambia, Ghana and Côte d'Ivoire, while en route to London, UK. After returning to Cape Town, the ship then visited Antarctica. During the cruise various scientific experiments and observations were completed for the Council for Scientific and Industrial Research and the Departments of Science and Technology and Environmental Affairs. In 2013, the vessel delivered The Coldest Journey team, which was an Antarctica winter crossing expedition led by Sir Ranulph Fiennes in support of the charity "Seeing is Believing".

See also

References

External links

 South African Maritime Safety Authority - The present owners (Official website).
 South African National Antarctic Programme - The previous owners (Official website).

Agulhas
Maritime history of South Africa
South African National Antarctic Programme
1977 ships
Research vessels
Training ships